Karnail Rana is an Indian singer of Himachal Pradesh who is famous for his Himachali songs. He has recorded more than 150 albums, and become a star overnight with his first album Chambe Patne Do Bediyaan or Sabna Da Rakhwala Shivaji or More....

Early life and background
Karnail Rana was born on 30 April 1963 in Village Ghallaur in Kangra, Himachal Pradesh. He completed his schooling
from Government High School, Ghallaur and then graduated from Government College, Dharamshala in music. His father, the late Ran Singh Rana, had served in the army and then ONGC whereas his mother, Indira Rana, was a housewife. Rana got early lessons in music from his family as his father was also interested in singing and he learned the basics in college. Rana recalls that when his family assembled on any occasion, they always enjoyed singing and playing various instruments. He had also been participating in various functions organized in school and college and winning appreciation and awards for his talent. He had participated in many singing shows at all levels, including Nehru Yuva Kendra and the Inter State Folk Exchange Programme, and winning laurels. Earlier, he was interested in ghazal singing but one incident during an inter college function diverted his attention towards folk singing. Karnail Rana, though a participant in the competition was asked to give a guest performance also and he sang a folk song.

Career
After his debut album, he never looked back and went on to become an icon in Himachali folk singing. Rana's first cassette was titled Chambe Patne Do Bediyan in 1994. It made him a star in folk singing overnight. Since then, he has released more than 150 albums in association with T Series. His songs were famous not only in Himachal but also in Punjab, Haryana, Chandigarh where most of Himachali people also live. He has received awards from the organization of Himachal and those formed by Himachali people living in other states, including Maharashtra and Punjab and other states. After serving in Nehru Yuva Kendra in 1987, Karnail Rana has been serving in Public Relations Department since 1988.

Discography
His songs like "Ik Joda Sutey Da","Bhala Sadhu Jogiya","Ghare Chuttiyan Aija","Kaisa Laga Goriye" were huge hit. His bhajans like "Jogiya Ve Jogiya","Dhaulgiri Parbat te","Fulaan di Barkha Layi Babe Ne" were famous in North India.
 Bindu Neelu Do Sakhiyan
 Patna Deya Taarua,
 Mere Bhole Chale Kailash
 Mere Bum Bhole
 Rangla Himachal
 Kaisa Laga Goriye
 Paunahari Jogi Ho Giya
 Ik Joda Soote Da 
 Bhala Sadhu Jogiya
 Sabna Da Rakhwala Shivji
 Jogi Supne De Bich Aaya,
 Minjo Laung Ghadaai De
 Vichhoda Jogi Da
 Jai Bhole Nath
 Geet Pahadan De
 Sachchi Shraddha De Naal Koee Bulanda Naiyo
 Babe Da Chala Aa Gaya
 Chhail Jawana
 Tu Jap Lei Hari Da Naam
 Nath Kadaniyan
 Phullaan Di Barkha Layi Babe Ne 
 Paunahaariya Dhoona Lagaya Peeplaan Heth 
 Paunahaari Jogi Ho Giya
 Tu Japp Lai Jindadiye Do Ghadiyan Pal Baih Ke
 Gharae Chhuttiyan Aai Ja
 Nindre Paarein Paarein Chali Jaayaan
 Chamba Chamba Aakhdi
 Sai Nath Baso Mann Mere
 Daso Babaji Mukh Kedi Gallon Modeya
 Mahlan De Hetthan 
 Chhutti Aaeeja Din Char
 Banjara 
 Koulan Gaddan
 Dil Lagda Na Ranjhna Mera
 Himachali Lok Rang Tarang
 Bharti Hoee Jaana Pardes
 Toteyaan Bolna De Vol-1
 Aa Giya Bansri Wala
 Chhaile Bage Da Mor
 Chhad De Duniya Wali Mauj Noo
 Shaan Himachale Di
 Urheyaan Ni Urheyaan Kali Koyaley
 Raunakan Himachale Diyan
 Thokar Tera Bhala Kare
 Fauji Munda Aa Gaya Chutti Part 2
 Chalo Mani Mahesh
 Lachchi Lachchi Lok Gallaan De

References

Living people
1963 births
Indian male folk singers
People from Kangra district
Singers from Himachal Pradesh